Cidade Ameaçada is a 1960 Brazilian crime film directed by Roberto Farias. It was submitted into the 1960 Cannes Film Festival. The plot follows the story of a São Paulo criminal known as "Passarinho", which is based on an actual criminal dubbed "Promessinha".

Cast
 Jardel Filho
 Eva Wilma
 Reginaldo Faria 
 Pedro Paulo Hatheyer
 Ana Maria Nabuco
 Milton Gonçalves
 Mozael Silveira
 Dionísio Azevedo
 Fregolente
 Doca
 Eugenio Kusnet
 Alberto Prado
 Suzy Arruda
 Fernando Marques

References

External links

1960 crime films
1960 films
1960s Portuguese-language films
Brazilian black-and-white films
Brazilian crime films
Films directed by Roberto Farias